This is the discography of late American rapper, Lord Infamous.

Albums

Solo albums

Albums With Black Rain Ent/Club House Click

Albums With Three 6 Mafia

The Serial Killers (DJ Paul & Lord Infamous)

Albums With Tear Da Club Up Thugs

Singles

As Lead Artist

As Featured On

Music videos

As Lead Artist

As Featured On

References

Hip hop discographies
Discographies of American artists

it:Discografia dei Three 6 Mafia